Faki is a surname. Notable people with the surname include:

 Ali Faki (born 1964), Malawian boxer
 Bakari Shamis Faki (born 1939), Tanzanian politician
 Haji Faki, Tanzanian politician
 Len Faki, German DJ and producer
 Moussa Faki (born 1960), Chadian politician and diplomat